The article lists cities in Kerala according to WHO's database on ambient (outdoor) air pollution monitoring from almost 1600 cities in 91 countries. It includes 124 Indian cities, among that 8 are from Kerala.

References

Air pollution in India
Environmental issues in India
Cities by ambient air quality
Lists of cities in Kerala